Johann Friedrich Fasch (15 April 1688 – 5 December 1758) was a German violinist and composer. Much of his music is in the Baroque-Classical transitional style known as galant.

Life
Fasch was born in the town of Buttelstedt, 11 km north of Weimar, the eldest child of schoolmaster Friedrich Georg Fasch and his wife Sophie Wegerig, from  Leißling near Weißenfels. After his father's death in 1700, Fasch lived with his maternal uncle, the clergyman Gottfried Wegerig in Göthewitz, and it was presumably in this way that he made the acquaintance of the Opera composer Reinhard Keiser.

Fasch was a choirboy in Weissenfels and studied under Johann Kuhnau at the St. Thomas School in Leipzig. It was in Leipzig in 1708 that he founded a Collegium Musicum. In 1711 he wrote an opera to be performed at the Peter-Paul Festival in Naumburg, and a second one for the festival in 1712.

In 1714, unable to procure aristocratic patronage for a journey to Italy, Fasch instead travelled  to Darmstadt to study composition for three months under his former Leipzig prefect Christoph Graupner and Gottfried Grünewald. He then traveled extensively in Germany, becoming a violinist in the orchestra in Bayreuth in 1714, was an amanuensis in Gera till 1719 and from 1719 until 1721 held a court post as organist in Greiz.

His next major post was Prague, where he served for two years as Kapellmeister and court composer to Count Morzin. In 1722, he "reluctantly accepted the position" of court Kapellmeister at Zerbst, a post he held until his death. (The organist Johann Ulich was his assistant.) Also in 1722, he was invited to apply for the position of Thomaskantor in Leipzig at his alma mater, the St. Thomas School, but he chose to withdraw his name from the competition. The Leipzig opening was eventually filled by Johann Sebastian Bach, who had considerable esteem for Fasch.

Works
His works include cantatas, concertos, symphonies, and chamber music. None of his music was published in his lifetime, and according to The New Grove Dictionary of Music and Musicians in 2014, "it appears that most of his vocal works (including 9 complete cantata cycles, at least 14 masses and four operas) are lost, while the instrumental works are mostly extant."  However, his music was "widely performed" in his day  and was held in high regard by contemporaries. Georg Philipp Telemann performed a cycle of his church cantatas in 1733 in Hamburg; an organ work once attributed to Johann Sebastian Bach as BWV 585 is now known to be an arrangement of movements from a Fasch trio sonata; and Bach's Collegium Musicum in Leipzig (a different group than the one founded by Fasch) performed some of Fasch's Orchestral Suites (ten of them, according to Hugo Riemann in 1900, based on his examination of copies in the library of the St. Thomas School, which Riemann said were partly in Bach's hand. Only one of these suites survived World War II; it is in the hand of Bach's student Carl Gotthelf Gerlach).

In 1900, Riemann asserted that Fasch's style was an important link between the Baroque and Classical periods, and that he was one of those who "set instrumental music entirely on its feet and displaced fugal writing with modern 'thematic' style’"; New Groves entry on Fasch states, "Later research has largely confirmed [Riemann's] assessment."

Legacy
Fasch died in Zerbst at the age of 70 on 5 December 1758. He was the father of Carl Friedrich Christian Fasch, born on 18 November 1736, like his father a musician of note. The city of Zerbst/Anhalt has been hosting International Festivals since 1983, biennially since 1993.  The Sixteenth International Fasch Festival (2021) was cancelled due to Covid-19 restrictions. The 17th International Fasch Festival is scheduled to take place from 15 to 18 June 2023 in Zerbst/Anhalt.

Works list
This listing is based on Rüdiger Pfeiffer's now out-dated Fasch Werke Verzeichnis. The Internationale Fasch Gesellschaft e.V. has been working on a new online Fasch-Verzeichnis, which is now called Fasch-Repertorium. Its main contributor, Dr. Gottfried Gille, gave a paper on the project's progress at the 2013 international Fasch conference, held on the occasion of the twelfth International Fasch Festival (18-21 April 2013). All papers presented at the conference were published in vol. 12 of Fasch-Studien.OperasFwv A \ Operas (lost)SerenatasFwv B: 1 \ Serenata (lost)
Fwv B: 2 \ Serenata (lost)
Fwv B: 3 \ Freudenbezeugung der vier Tageszeiten, autograph score at D-DS
Fwv B: 4 \ Beglückter Tag (for the birthday of Catherine the Great, 1757), autograph score and performing materials in the Sing-Akademie Berlin archive, D-B; performed at 10th Fasch-Festtage on 10 April 2008Sacred cantatas for occasionsFwv C:B 1 \ Beständigkeit bleibt mein VergnügenSacred cantatasFwv D:B 1 \ Bewahre deinen Fuss
Fwv D:D 1 \ Dein allerhöchster Adel
Fwv D:D 2 \ Der Gottlose ist wie ein Wetter
Fwv D:D 3 \ Die den Herrn vertrauen
Fwv D:D 4 \ Die Gerechten müssen sich freuen
Fwv D:D 5 \ Die so das Land des Lichts bewohnen
Fwv D:D 6 \ Die Starken bedürfen des Arztes nicht
Fwv D:D 7 \ Die Starken bedürfen des Arztes nicht
Fwv D:D 8 \ Du bist Christus, des lebendigen Gottes Sohn
Fwv D:D 9 \ Du bist mein Gott, ich bitte dich
Fwv D:D10 \ Du sollst Gott, deinen Herrn, lieben
Fwv D:E 1 \ Ehre sei Gott in der Höhe
Fwv D:E 2 \ Er hat grosse Dinge an mir getan
Fwv D:E 3 \ Es erhub sich ein Streit
Fwv D:E 4 \ Es haben dir, Herr, die Hoffärtigen
Fwv D:E 5 \ Es wird des Herrn Tag kommen
Fwv D:E 6 \ Es wird ein unbarmherzig Gericht
Fwv D:G 1 \ Gehet zu seinen Toren ein
Fwv D:G 2 \ Gelobet sei der Herr täglich
Fwv D:G 3 \ Gottes und Marien Kind
Fwv D:G 4 \ Gott hat die Zeit der Unwissenheit übersehen
Fwv D:G 5 \ Gott ist die Liebe
Fwv D:G 6 \ Gott ist die Liebe
Fwv D:G 7 \ Gott ist ein rechter Richter
Fwv D:G 8 \ Gott will, dass allen Menschen
Fwv D:G 9 \ Gott wir warten deiner Güte
Fwv D:G10 \ Gott wir warten deiner Güte
Fwv D:H 1 \ Herr, gehe nicht ins Gericht
Fwv D:H 2 \ Herr, lehre uns bedenken
Fwv D:H 3 \ Herr, wenn Trübsal da ist
Fwv D:I 1 \ Ich bin der Weg
Fwv D:I 2 \ Ich danke dem Herrn von ganzem Herzen
Fwv D:I 3 \ Ich freue mich im Herrn
Fwv D:I 4 \ Ich halte mich, Herr, zu deinen Altar
Fwv D:I 5 \ Ich hebe meine Augen auf
Fwv D:I 6 \ Ich hoffe darauf, dass du so gnädig bist
Fwv D:I 7 \ Ich war tot, und siehe, ich bin lebendig
Fwv D:I 8 \ In der Welt habt ihr Angst
Fwv D:J 1 \ Jauchzet dem Herrn alle Welt; Edition 2008 Gottfried Gille for Prima la musica!
Fwv D:K 1 \ Kommet her zu mir alle
Fwv D:K 2 \ Kündlich gross ist das gottselige Geheimnis
Fwv D:L 1 \ Leben wir, so leben wir dem Herrn
Fwv D:L 2 \ Lobe den Herrn, meine Seele
Fwv D:L 3 \ Lobe den Herrn, meine Seele
Fwv D:M 1 \ Mein Seel erhebt den Herren mein
Fwv D:N 1 \ Niemand kennet den Sohn
Fwv D:N 2 \ Niemand kennet den Sohn
Fwv D:R 1 \ Rast und tobt, ihr stolzen Feinde
Fwv D:S 1 \ Sage mir an, du, den meine Seele liebet
Fwv D:S 2 \ Sanftes Brausen, süsses Sausen; Edition 2008 Gottfried Gille for Prima la musica!
Fwv D:S 3 \ Seid untereinander freundlich, herzlich
Fwv D:S 4 \ Sei getreu bis in den Tod
Fwv D:S 5 \ Selig sind, die nicht sehen und doch gläuben
Fwv D:S 6 \ Siehe um Trost war mir sehr bange
Fwv D:S 7 \ Siehe zu, dass deine Gottesfurcht nicht
Fwv D:T 1 \ Trachtet am ersten nach dem Reiche Gottes
Fwv D:U 1 \ Unser Wandel ist im Himmel
Fwv D:W 1 \ Wachet und betet, das ihr nicht in Anfechtung
Fwv D:W 2 \ Welt und Teufel, tobt ihr noch
Fwv D:W 3 \ Welt, du magst mich immer hassen (fragment)
Fwv D:W 4 \ Wer sich selbst erhöhet
Fwv D:W 5 \ Wie Gott liebt und vergibt
Fwv D:W 6 \ Will mir jemand nachfolgen
Fwv D:W 7 \ Wirf dein Anliegen auf den Herrn
Fwv D:W 8 \ Wir müssen alle offenbar werden
Fwv D:W 9 \ Wir wissen, dass der Sohn Gottes
Fwv D:Z 1 \ Zion mach in deinen Toren
Fwv D:Z 2 \ Zur Mitternacht war ein Geschrei (fragment)MotetsFwv E:B 1 \ Beschliesset einen RatPassion oratoriosFwv F: 1 Passio Jesu Christi ("Brockes Passion")MassesFwv G:B 1 \ Missa brevis in B flat major
Fwv G:D 1 \ Mass in D major
Fwv G:D 2 \ Mass in D major
Fwv G:D 3 \ Missa brevis in D major
Fwv G:D 4 \ Missa brevis in D major
Fwv G:D 5 \ Missa brevis in D major
Fwv G:D 6 \ Credo in D major
Fwv G:D 7 \ Credo in D major - NOT FASCH, but Johann David Heinichen
Fwv G:e 1 \ German Mass in E minor
Fwv G:F 1 \ Mass in F major
Fwv G:F 2 \ Missa brevis in F major
Fwv G:F 3 \ Quoniam in F major
Fwv G:g 1 \ Missa brevis in G minorCanticlesFwv H:G 1 \ Magnificat in G majorPsalm settingsFwv I:B 1 \ Beatus vir in G major
Fwv I:C 1 \ Confiteor in D major
Fwv I:D 1 \ Dixit Dominus in G major
Fwv I:L 1 \ Laetatus sum in F sharp minor
Fwv I:L 2 \ Lauda Jerusalem in D major
Fwv I:L 3 \ Laudate Pueri Dominum in A major
Fwv I:N 1 \ Nisi Dominus in D majorOrchestral suites(Unless otherwise stated, these are scored for 2 oboes, bassoon, strings and Basso continuo
Fwv K:A 1 \ Suite for violin, 2 oboes & 2 bassoons in A major
Fwv K:A 2 \ Suite for 2 flutes, 2 oboes & bassoon in A major
Fwv K:A 3 \ Suite for 2 oboes & bassoon in A major
Fwv K:a 1 \ Suite for 2 flutes, 2 oboes & bassoon in A minor
Fwv K:a 2 \ Suite for 2 oboes & 2 bassoons in A minor
Fwv K:a 3 \ Suite for 2 oboes & 2 bassoons in A minor
Fwv K:a 4 \ Suite for 2 oboes & bassoon in A minor
Fwv K:B 1 \ Suite for 2 orchestras (3 flutes, 3 oboes, 2 bassoons, strings and basso continuo in each orchestra)
Fwv K:B 2 \ Suite for 2 flutes, 2 oboes & bassoon in B flat major
Fwv K:B 3 \ Suite for 2 flutes, 2 oboes & bassoon in B flat major
Fwv K:B 4 \ Suite for 2 flutes, 2 oboes & bassoon in B flat major
Fwv K:B 5 \ Suite for 2 oboes & bassoon in B flat major
Fwv K:B 6 \ Suite for 2 oboes & bassoon, strings and b.c.in B flat major* Modern edition by W.Jaksch http://www.imslp.org
Fwv K:B 7 \ Suite for 2 oboes & bassoon in B flat major
Fwv K:B 8 \ Suite for 2 oboes & bassoon in B flat major
Fwv K:B 9 \ Suite for 2 oboes & bassoon in B flat major
Fwv K:B10 \ Suite for 2 oboes & bassoon in B flat major
Fwv K:C 1 \ Suite for 2 oboes & 2 bassoons in C major * Modern edition: Hans-Heinrich Kriegel; Bochum: 1998
Fwv K:C 2 \ Suite in C major (lost)
Fwv K:C 3 \ Suite for 2 oboes & bassoon in C major (lost)
Fwv K:D 1 \ Suite for 3 trumpets & winds in D major
Fwv K:D 2 \ Suite for 3 trumpets & winds in D major
Fwv K:D 3 \ Suite for 2 trumpets, 3 oboes & bassoon in D major
Fwv K:D 4 \ Suite for 2 trumpets, 2 oboes & bassoon in D major
Fwv K:D 5 \ Suite for 3 horns, 3 oboes & 2 bassoons in D major
Fwv K:D 6 \ Suite for wind septet in D major
Fwv K:D 7 \ Suite for 2 flutes,2 oboes & bassoon, 2 horns, strings and b.c. in D major * Modern edition by W.Jaksch http://www.imslp.org
Fwv K:D 8 \ Suite for wind septet in D major
Fwv K:D 9 \ Suite for wind septet in D major
Fwv K:D10 \ Suite for wind septet in D major
Fwv K:D11 \ Suite in D major (lost)
Fwv K:D12 \ Suite for 2 horns, 2 oboes & bassoon in D major
Fwv K:D13 \ Suite for 2 horns, 2 oboes & bassoon in D major
Fwv K:D14 \ Suite for 2 horns, 2 oboes & bassoon in D major * Modern edition in preparation by Kim Patrick Clow for Prima la musica!
Fwv K:D15 \ Suite for 2 horns, 2 oboes & bassoon in D major
Fwv K:D16 \ Suite for 2 flutes, 2 oboes & bassoon in D major
Fwv K:D17 \ Suite for 2 flutes, 2 oboes & bassoon in D major
Fwv K:D18 \ Suite for 2 flutes, 2 oboes & bassoon in D major
Fwv K:D19 \ Suite in D major (lost)
Fwv K:D20 \ Suite for 2 oboes & 2 bassoons in D major
Fwv K:D21 \ Suite for 2 oboes & bassoon in D major
Fwv K:D22 \ Suite for 2 oboes & bassoon in D major
Fwv K:D23 \ Suite for 2 oboes & bassoon in D major
Fwv K:D24 \ Suite for 2 oboes & bassoon in D major
Fwv K:D25 \ Suite for 2 oboes & bassoon in D major
Fwv K:D26 \ Suite for 2 oboes & bassoon in D major
Fwv K:d 1 \ Suite in D minor (lost)
Fwv K:d 2 \ Suite for 3 flutes, 3 oboes & bassoon in D minor
Fwv K:d 3 \ Suite for chalumeau, 2 oboes & bassoon in D minor
Fwv K:d 4 \ Suite for 2 oboes & bassoon in D minor
Fwv K:d 5 \ Suite for 2 oboes & bassoon in D minor
Fwv K:d 6 \ Suite for 2 oboes & bassoon in D minor
Fwv K:e 1 \ Suite for 2 flutes, 2 oboes & bassoon in E minor
Fwv K:e 2 \ Suite for 2 oboes & bassoon in E minor
Fwv K:e 3 \ Suite for 2 oboes & bassoon in E minor
Fwv K:Es1 \ Suite for 2 oboes & bassoon in E flat major
Fwv K:F 1 \ Suite for wind septet in F major
Fwv K:F 2 \ Suite in F major (lost)
Fwv K:F 3 \ Suite for 2 horns, 2 oboes & bassoon in F major
Fwv K:F 4 \ Suite for 2 horns, 2 oboes & bassoon in F major
Fwv K:F 5 \ Suite for 2 horns, 2 oboes & bassoon in F major
Fwv K:F 6 \ Suite for 2 flutes, 2 oboes & bassoon in F major
Fwv K:F 7 \ Suite for 2 oboes & 2 bassoons in F major * Modern edition in preparation by Kim Patrick Clow for Prima la musica! 
Fwv K:F 8 \ Suite for 2 oboes & bassoon in F major
Fwv K:F 9 \ Suite in F major (lost)
Fwv K:G 1 \ Suite for violin & wind septet in G major
Fwv K:G 2 \ Suite for violin & oboe concertante in G major * Modern edition in preparation by Kim Patrick Clow for Prima la musica!
Fwv K:G 3 \ Suite for wind septet in G major
Fwv K:G 4 \ Suite for wind septet in G major
Fwv K:G 5 \ Suite for 4 horns, 3 oboes & bassoon in G major
Fwv K:G 6 \ Suite in G major (lost)
Fwv K:G 7 \ Suite in G major (lost)
Fwv K:G 8 \ Suite for 3 flutes & 2 bassoons in G major * Modern edition in preparation by Hans-Heinrich Kriegel for Prima la musica! 
Fwv K:G 9 \ Suite for 2 oboes & 2 bassoons in G major
Fwv K:G10 \ Suite for 2 flutes, 2 oboes & bassoon in G major
Fwv K:G11 \ Suite for 2 flutes, 2 oboes & bassoon in G major
Fwv K:G12 \ Suite for 2 flutes, 2 oboes & bassoon in G major
Fwv K:G13 \ Suite for 2 oboes & bassoon in G major
Fwv K:G14 \ Suite for 2 flutes, 2 oboes & bassoon in G major (lost)
Fwv K:G15 \ Suite for 3 oboes & bassoon in G major
Fwv K:G16 \ Suite for 2 oboes & bassoon in G major * Modern edition in preparation by Kim Patrick Clow for Prima la musica! 
Fwv K:G17 \ Suite for 2 oboes & bassoon in G major
Fwv K:G18 \ Suite for 2 oboes & bassoon in G major
Fwv K:G19 \ Suite for 2 oboes & bassoon in G major
Fwv K:G20 \ Suite for 2 oboes & bassoon in G major
Fwv K:G21 \ Suite for 2 oboes & bassoon in G major
Fwv K:G22 \ Suite for 2 oboes & bassoon in G major (lost)
Fwv K:g 1 \ Suite for 2 oboes & bassoon in G minor
Fwv K:g 2 \ Suite for 3 oboes & bassoon in G minor
Fwv K:g 3 \ Suite for 2 oboes & 2 bassoons in G minor
Fwv K:g 4 \ Suite for 2 oboes & bassoon in G minor
Fwv K:g 5 \ Suite for 2 oboes & bassoon in G minor
Fwv K:g 6 \ Suite in G minor (lost)
Fwv K:g 7 \ Suite for 2 oboes & bassoon in G minorConcertosFwv L:A 1 \ Violin Concerto in A major
Fwv L:A 2 \ Violin Concerto in A major
Fwv L:A 3 \ Violin Concerto in A major
Fwv L:a 1 \ Oboe Concerto in A minor
Fwv L:a 2 \ Violin Concerto in A minor
Fwv L:B 1 \ Concerto for chalumeau in B flat major
Fwv L:B 2 \ Violin Concerto in B flat major
Fwv L:B 3 \ Concerto grosso in B flat major
Fwv L:B 4 \ Concerto grosso in B flat major
Fwv L:C 1 \ Oboe Concerto in C major
Fwv L:C 2 \ Bassoon Concerto in C major
Fwv L:C 3 \ Concerto for flute, violin, bassoon & b.c. in C major
Fwv L:c 1 \ Concerto for bassoon, strings & b.c. in C minor
Fwv L:c 2 \ Concerto for 2 oboes, bassoon, strings & b.c. in C minor
Fwv L:D 1 \ Concerto for trumpet & 2 oboes in D major
Fwv L:D 2 \ Violin Concerto in D major
Fwv L:D 3 \ Violin Concerto in D major
Fwv L:D 4 \ Violin Concerto in D major
Fwv L:D 4a \ Violin Concerto in D major (Fwv L:D 4a)
Fwv L:D 5 \ Violin Concerto in D major
Fwv L:D 6 \ Violin Concerto in D major
Fwv L:D 7 \ Violin Concerto in D major
Fwv L:D 8 \ Violin Concerto in D major
Fwv L:D 9 \ Concerto for 2 flutes in D major
Fwv L:D10 \ Concerto for flute and oboe in D major
Fwv L:D11 \ Concerto for flute and oboe in D major
Fwv L:D12 \ Concerto in D major (lost)
Fwv L:D13 \ Concerto for triple wind choirs in D major
Fwv L:D14 \ Concerto grosso in D major
Fwv L:D15 \ Concerto grosso in D major
Fwv L:D16 \ Concerto grosso in D major
Fwv L:D17 \ Concerto grosso in D major
Fwv L:D18 \ Concerto grosso in D major
Fwv L:D19 \ Concerto grosso in D major
Fwv L:D20 \ Concerto grosso in D major
Fwv L:D21 \ Concerto grosso in D major
Fwv L:D22 \ Concerto grosso in D major
Fwv L:d 1 \ Lute Concerto in D minor
Fwv L:d 2 \ Oboe Concerto in D minor
Fwv L:d 3 \ Oboe Concerto in D minor
Fwv L:d 4 \ Concerto for oboe and violin in D minor
Fwv L:d 5 \ Concerto in D minor (lost)
Fwv L:d 6 \ Concerto for flute, violin, bassoon & b.c. in D minor
Fwv L:d 7 \ Concerto grosso in D minor
Fwv L:e 1 \ Concerto for flute and oboe in E minor
Fwv L:Es1 \ Concerto grosso in E flat major
Fwv L:F 1 \ Concerto in F major (lost)
Fwv L:F 2 \ Violin Concerto in F major
Fwv L:F 3 \ Concerto grosso in F major
Fwv L:F 4 \ Concerto grosso in F major
Fwv L:F 5 \ Concerto grosso in F major
Fwv L:F 6 \ Concerto for Alto recorder in F major * Modern edition by Johannes Pausch for  Edition Musiklandschaften Hamburg  
Fwv L:G 1 \ Concerto in G major (lost)
Fwv L:G 2 \ Oboe Concerto in G major
Fwv L:G 3 \ Oboe Concerto in G major
Fwv L:G 4 \ Concerto for violin, 2 flutes, 2 oboes, bassoon, strings, continuo in G major
Fwv L:G 5 \ Violin Concerto in G major
Fwv L:G 6 \ Violin Concerto in G major
Fwv L:G 7 \ Violin Concerto in G major
Fwv L:G 8 \ Concerto for flute and oboe in G major
Fwv L:G 9 \ Concerto for 2 oboes in G major
Fwv L:G10 \ Concerto for 2 oboes in G major
Fwv L:G11 \ Concerto grosso in G major
Fwv L:G12 \ Concerto grosso in G major
Fwv L:G13 \ Concerto grosso in G major
Fwv L:g 1 \ Oboe Concerto in G minor
Fwv L:g 2 \ Concerto in G minor (lost)
Fwv L:g 3 \ Concerto in G minor (lost)
Fwv L:g 4 \ Concerto for 2 oboes in G minor
Fwv L:h 1 \ Concerto for flute and oboe in B minor
Fwv L:h 2 \ Concerto for flute and oboe in B minorSymphoniesFwv M:A 1 \ Symphony in A major
Fwv M:A 2 \ Symphony in A major [Possibly Carl Friedrich Fasch] 
Fwv M:A 3 \ Symphony in A major
Fwv M:a 1 \ Symphony in A minor
Fwv M:B 1 \ Symphony in B flat major
Fwv M:B 2 \ Symphony in B flat major
Fwv M:B 3 \ Symphony in B flat major
Fwv M:C 1 \ Symphony in C major
Fwv M:D 1 \ Symphony in D major
Fwv M:D 2 \ Symphony in D major
Fwv M:F 1 \ Symphony in F major
Fwv M:Fis \ Symphony in F sharp major
Fwv M:G 1 \ Symphony in G major
Fwv M:G 2 \ Symphony in G major
Fwv M:G 3 \ Symphony in G major
Fwv M:G 4 \ Symphony in G major
Fwv M:G 5 \ Symphony in G major
Fwv M:G 6 \ Symphony in G major
Fwv M:g 1 \ Symphony in G minorChamber piecesFwv N:a 1 \ Trio for 2 violins & continuo in A minor
Fwv N:B 1 \ Quartet for recorder, oboe, violin & continuo in B flat major
Fwv N:B 2 \ Quartet for 2 oboes, bassoon & continuo in B flat major
Fwv N:B 3 \ Trio for 2 oboes & continuo in B flat major
Fwv N:C 1 \ Bassoon Sonata in C major
Fwv N:c 1 \ Quartet for 2 violins,  & continuo in C minor
Fwv N:c 2 \ Trio for 2 violins & continuo in C minor
Fwv N:D 1 \ Quartet for flute, violin, bassoon & continuo in D major
Fwv N:D 2 \ Trio for flute, violin & continuo in D major
Fwv N:D 3 \ Trio for flute, violin & continuo in D major
Fwv N:D 4 \ Trio for 2 violins & continuo in D major
Fwv N:d 1 \ Quartet for 2 oboes, bassoon & continuo in D minor
Fwv N:d 2 \ Quartet for 2 oboes, bassoon & continuo in D minor
Fwv N:d 3 \ Quartet for 2 violins, viola & b.c. in D minor
Fwv N:d 4 \ Trio for 2 violins & continuo in D minor
Fwv N:E 1 \ Trio for 2 violins & continuo in E major
Fwv N:e 1 \ Trio for 2 oboes & continuo in E minor
Fwv N:F 1 \ Quartet for 2 oboes & 2 bassoons in F major
Fwv N:F 2 \ Quartet for 2 oboes, bassoon & continuo in F major
Fwv N:F 3 \ Quartet oboe, violin, horn & continuo in F major
Fwv N:F 4 \ Quartet for oboe, violin, bassoon & continuo in F major
Fwv N:F 5 \ Trio for recorder, bassoon & continuo in F major
Fwv N:F 6 \ Trio for 2 oboes & bassoon in F major
Fwv N:F 7 \ Trio for 2 violins & continuo in F major
Fwv N:G 1 \ Quartet for flute, 2 recorders & continuo in G major
Fwv N:G 2 \ Trio for flute, violin & continuo in G major
Fwv N:G 3 \ Trio for flute, violin & continuo in G major
Fwv N:G 4 \ Trio for 2 violins & continuo in G major
Fwv N:G 5 \ Trio for 2 violins & continuo in G major
Fwv N:G 6 \ Trio for 2 violins & continuo in G major
Fwv N:g 1 \ Quartet for 2 oboes, bassoon & continuo in G minor
Fwv N:g 2 \ Trio for 2 oboes & continuo in G minorDoubtful authenticityFwv O:F 1 \ Fantasie in F majorCopies of works by other composers'
Fwv Q:D 1 \ Symphony in D major by Maximilian III
Fwv Q:deest \ Symphony in C major by Carl Hoeckh
Fwv Q:deest \ Symphony in C major by Placidus von Camerloher

References

Further reading 
 Reul, Barbara (2011). "'Forgive us our debts' – Viewing the life and career of Johann Friedrich Fasch (1688-1758) through the lens of finance.” Eighteenth-Century Music 8, no. 2 (2011), pp. 261–286.

Selected discography
Johann Friedrich Fasch: Orchesterwerke Vol.1. Tempesta di Mare. (Chandos Records CHAN0751, 2007) + vols. 2 [CHAN0783] & 3 [CHAN0791]
Johann Friedrich Fasch: Concertos for various instruments Vol 1. Il Gardelino. (Accent Records ACC24182, 2007) + vol 2 [Accent Records ACC24252, 2011]
Johann Friedrich Fasch: Ouverturen. Il Fondamento, Paul Dombrecht. (Fuga Libera, FUG502, 2004)
Violin concertos from Dresden. Pisendel, Heinichen, Fasch, Handel, Telemann. Johannes Pramsohler. International Baroque Players. (Raumklang RK 3105)
Violin concertos from Darmstadt. Kress, Telemann, Fasch, Endler. Johannes Pramsohler. Darmstädter Barocksolisten (Audax Records ADX 13716)
The Dresden Album. Ensemble Diderot. Johannes Pramsohler (Audax Records ADX 13701)
Johann Friedrich Fasch: Ouvertüren-Sinfonian. Les Amis de Philippe, Ludger Rémy. (Classic Produktion Osnabrück, 7779522, 2015)
Johann Friedrich Fasch: Dresdner Ouvertüren, Sinfonias & Konzerte. Les Amis de Philippe, Ludger Rémy. (Classic Produktion Osnabrück, 7774242, 2008)
Johann Friedrich Fasch: Concertos. La Stravaganza, Koln. (Classic Production Osnabruck 7770152, 2004)
Johann Friedrich Fasch: Cantatas, Psalm, Ouverture & Concerto. Accademia Daniel, Shalev Ad-El. (Classic Production Osnabruck, 9996742, 2000)
Johann Friedrich Fasch: Concerti & Ouverturen. Kammerorchester Basel, Julia Schroder. (Deutsche Harmonia Mundi, 88697446412, 2009)
Johann Friedrich Fasch: Trios and Sonatas. Epoca Barocca. (Classic Produktion Osnabrück 7772042, 2007)
Johann Friedrich Fasch: Quartette & Konzerte. Ensemble Marsyas. (Linn Records CKD467, 2013)
Johann Friedrich Fasch: Quartets & Trio Sonatas. Camerata Koln. (Deutsche Harmonia Mundi 77015-2RG, 1988)

External links
International Fasch Society
Modern urtext editions of Fasch's music via Brian Clark's Prima la Musica!

1688 births
1758 deaths
18th-century classical composers
18th-century German composers
18th-century German male musicians
German Classical-period composers
German Baroque composers
German male classical composers
People from Buttelstedt